In the context of places in Trinidad and Tobago, Canaan can refer to either: 

 Canaan, Tobago, birthplace of Dwight Yorke
 Canaan, Trinidad

See also 
 List of cities and towns in Trinidad and Tobago

Populated places in Trinidad and Tobago